Clare Kilner is an English film director. She directed the films How to Deal (2003) and The Wedding Date (2005).

Credit
Saplings (1993, short film)
 Half Day (1994, short film)
 The Secret (1994, short film)
 Symbiosis (1995, short film)
 Daphne & Apollo (1997, short film)
 EastEnders (1997, TV series, 6 episodes)
 Janice Beard 45 WPM (1999, independent film)
 How to Deal (2003, feature film)
 Something Borrowed (2004, feature film)
 The Wedding Date (2005, feature film)
 American Virgin (2009, independent film)
 Child P.O.W. (2011, independent film)
 Delicious (2016–present, TV series)
 Claws (2018–present, TV series)
Sneaky Pete (2019, TV series, 2 episodes)
Trinkets (2019, TV series, 2 episodes)
Krypton (2019, TV series)
Pennyworth (2019, TV series)
The Alienist: Angel of Darkness (2019, TV series)
The Alienist (2020, TV series)
Debris (2021, TV series)
The Mosquito Coast (2021, TV series)
House of the Dragon (2022, TV Series)

References

External links

English film directors
English emigrants to the United States
English women film directors
Living people
Place of birth missing (living people)
Year of birth missing (living people)